Anton Kamenev (born 15 January 1986) is a Russian skier. He competed in the Nordic combined team event at the 2006 Winter Olympics.

References

External links
 

1986 births
Living people
Russian male Nordic combined skiers
Olympic Nordic combined skiers of Russia
Nordic combined skiers at the 2006 Winter Olympics
Skiers from Moscow